Volker Grabow (born 27 September 1956 in Essen) is a German rower. Together with his brother Guido he was a top rower in the coxless four.

References 

 
 

1956 births
Living people
Sportspeople from Essen
Rowers at the 1984 Summer Olympics
Rowers at the 1988 Summer Olympics
Olympic bronze medalists for West Germany
Olympic rowers of West Germany
Olympic medalists in rowing
West German male rowers
Medalists at the 1988 Summer Olympics
World Rowing Championships medalists for West Germany